Heliodorus  is a Greek name meaning "Gift of the Sun". Several persons named Heliodorus are known to us from ancient times, the best known of which are: 

Heliodorus (minister) a minister of Seleucus IV Philopator c. 175 BC
Heliodorus of Athens ancient author who wrote fifteen books on the Acropolis of Athens, possibly about 150 BC
Heliodorus (ambassador), a Greek ambassador who erected famous votive Heliodorus pillar around 110 BC near Vidisha, Madhya Pradesh, India
Heliodorus (metrist) a metrist in the 1st century who did work on the comedies of Aristophanes
Heliodorus (surgeon) a surgeon in the 1st century, probably from Egypt, and mentioned in the Satires of Juvenal
Gaius Avidius Heliodorus, 2nd century secretarius ab epistolis and Prefect of Egypt
Heliodorus of Larissa, c. 3rd century, author of an extant treatise on optics
Heliodorus of Emesa, 3rd-century author of the novel Aethiopica
Heliodorus (sophist) a 3rd century sophist from Arabia Petraea
Heliodorus of Bet Zabdai (died 344), Syrian bishop and martyr
Heliodorus of Altino (died 390), 4th-century Christian saint
Heliodorus of Alexandria 5th-century Neoplatonist philosopher, and brother of Ammonius Hermiae
Heliodorus (6th-century philosopher), author of a work entitled Commentary
Heliodorus of Catania, 8th-century necromancer and witchdoctor from Catania

See also
 Sergei Trufanov (1880–1952), known as Heliodorus or Iliodor, associate and rival of Rasputin
 Heliodor Píka (1897–1949), a Czechoslovak army officer